Petr Korda and Cyril Suk were the defending champions, but Korda did not participate this year.  Suk partnered Daniel Vacek, losing in the quarterfinals.

Olivier Delaître and Guy Forget won the title, defeating Henri Leconte and Gary Muller 6–4, 6–7, 6–4 in the final.

Seeds

  Cyril Suk /  Daniel Vacek (quarterfinals)
  Henrik Holm /  Anders Järryd (quarterfinals, withdrew)
  Yevgeny Kafelnikov /  David Rikl (semifinals)
  Scott Melville /  Piet Norval (first round)

Draw

Draw

External links
Draw

1994 Gerry Weber Open